Evgeni Ignatov (born 4 June 1988) is a Bulgarian footballer who currently plays as a midfielder for Litex.

Career
Ignatov began his career at CSKA Sofia youth team, winning the Bulgarian youth championship in 2006. A few months later, he transferred to Chavdar Etropole, with which he played in the second division. Ignatov scored 22 goals in 58 matches for the club before moving to OFC Sliven 2000 on 1 July 2009.

In June 2022, Ignatov joined Litex Lovech.

Statistics

References

External links
 

1988 births
Living people
Bulgarian footballers
First Professional Football League (Bulgaria) players
FC Chavdar Etropole players
OFC Sliven 2000 players
FC Sportist Svoge players
PFC Vidima-Rakovski Sevlievo players
PFC Akademik Svishtov players
FC Kariana Erden players
FC Hebar Pazardzhik players
Association football midfielders